Barry Sless (born December 22, 1955) is an American musician from Baltimore, Maryland. He is plays both traditional six-string guitar and the pedal steel guitar.

Career

2020s
In March 2022, Sless was set to head out on the road with the group, Wolf Bros led by Bob Weir formerly with the Grateful Dead.

Performances with

Section 8
David Nelson Band
Phil and Friends
Moonalice
Kingfish
Great American Taxi
Rowan Brothers
The Avalon Allstars
Flying Other Brothers
Cowboy Jazz
The Chazz Cats
Honeysuckle Rogues
Chris Robinson Brotherhood
Greenleaf Rustlers
Bobby Weir & Wolf Bros

References

External links
[ Allmusic]

American rock guitarists
American male guitarists
Pedal steel guitarists
1955 births
Living people
Kingfish (band) members
20th-century American guitarists
20th-century American male musicians
Moonalice members
Flying Other Brothers members